The Cathedral of Saint Bonaventure in Banja Luka is one of four Roman Catholic cathedrals in Bosnia and Herzegovina. It is the seat of the Banja Luka Bishopric currently led by Bishop Franjo Komarica.

The cathedral was built in honor of Saint Bonaventure, a Franciscan theologian from the Middle Ages. It was constructed by Alfred Pichler in the 1970s after the original had been damaged in an earthquake.

The building suffered damage in the Bosnian War, but was reinaugurated in 2001 after the completion of repairs.

Burials
Marijan Marković
Alfred Pichler

References

Bonaventure
Buildings and structures in Republika Srpska
Churches in Banja Luka
Roman Catholic churches in Diocese of Banja Luka
Roman Catholic churches completed in 1973
1972 establishments in Bosnia and Herzegovina
20th-century Roman Catholic church buildings in Bosnia and Herzegovina